Thomas Franklin Deitz (January 17, 1952 – April 27, 2009) was an American fantasy novelist, professor, and artist from Georgia. He was best known for authoring the David Sullivan contemporary fantasy series, though he also authored three other fantasy series and a standalone novel set in the same universe as the David Sullivan series.

He was an assistant professor at Gainesville State College, where he was named faculty member of the year in 2008, and an adjunct professor at two other colleges. Deitz was awarded the Phoenix Award in 2007 for contributions toward Southern science fiction and fantasy fandom.

Deitz died on April 27, 2009 of heart failure after having a heart attack in January of the same year.

Biography
Thomas Franklin Deitz was born January 17, 1952, in Georgia. He earned both a Bachelor and a Master of Arts in medieval English from the University of Georgia.

Deitz won the Phoenix Award in 2007 for lifetime achievement in promoting Southern fandom. This award was given at the annual DeepSouthCon, a traveling convention in the southeastern United States. In 2007, it was held in Dickson, Tennessee as OutsideCon 20.

Deitz was an adjunct English faculty member at Gainesville State College, Lanier Tech, and Tri-County Community College, and received a tenure-track appointment as assistant professor in Fall 2008 at Gainesville State College. He was recognized as GSC's adjunct faculty member of the year in 2008.

In addition to writing, Deitz's creative outlets included creating murals and fantasy art, participating in drama productions (with minor roles in a number of community and college productions), model automobile collecting, costuming, and other pursuits via the Society for Creative Anachronism. He was a founding member of the SCA's Barony of Bryn Madoc.

Deitz died on Monday, April 27, 2009 of heart failure.  He had a heart attack in January of that year and was a candidate to receive a ventricular assist device (VAD), but had suffered too much damage to his heart for the device to be implanted.

Works

David Sullivan series
Windmaster's Bane (1986, Avon)
Fireshaper's Doom (1987, Avon)
Darkthunder's Way (1989, Avon)
Sunshaker's War (1990, Avon)
Stoneskin's Revenge (1991, Avon)
Ghostcountry's Wrath (1995, Avon)
Dreamseeker's Road (1995, Avon)
Landslayer's Law (1997, Avon)
Warstalker's Track (1999, Eos)

Though not part of this series, Deitz’ The Gryphon King (1989, Avon) is set in the same universe.

Soulsmith Trilogy
Soulsmith (1991, Avon)
Dreambuilder (1992, Avon)
Wordwright (1993, Avon)

A Tale of Eron series
Bloodwinter (1999, Bantam Spectra)
Springwar (2000, Bantam Spectra)
Summerblood (2001, Bantam Spectra)
Warautumn (2002, Bantam Spectra)

Thunderbird O'Conner series
Above the Lower Sky (1994, William Morrow & Co.)
The Demons in the Green (1996, Avon)

References

External links
Unofficial bibliography
Illustrated bibliography (unofficial)

20th-century American novelists
21st-century American novelists
American fantasy writers
American male novelists
American science fiction writers
University of Georgia alumni
Novelists from Georgia (U.S. state)
1952 births
2009 deaths
20th-century American male writers
21st-century American male writers